Ivan Elagin may refer to:

 Ivan Elagin (poet) (1918–1987), Russian émigré poet
 Ivan Yelagin (1725–1794), Russian historian, amateur poet and translator

See also
 Yelagin (surname)